Toronto Mass Choir is a Canadian gospel music group that incorporates contemporary gospel, traditional gospel as well as Caribbean music influences; founded in 1988.
 
Seeds of this gospel choir were sown during the choir’s initial live recording concert as part of the Association of Gospel Music Ministries workshop in October 1988. Since then the choir has recorded twelve albums including the Juno award winning album, Instrument of Praise, which won Contemporary Christian/Gospel album of the Year in 2003; Going Home, an all Caribbean gospel project in 2008, a Christmas album entitled A Christmas Gift in 2010, and a worship album entitled Made for Worship which was released in May 2014 as a CD+DVD combo. Its most recent album entitled “By Special Request” was released in June 2018.

In 2012, to kick off the choir’s 25th performance season a compilation album 25 was released. This compact disc features highlights of the choir’s original music of the past 25 years. That same year, TMC was also awarded the Lifetime Achievement Award from the Gospel Music Association of Canada.

Karen Burke, a graduate of McMaster University, the Royal Conservatory of Music and a Professor of music at York University, is the director of the diversified group of singers and musicians along with her husband, Oswald Burke, who is their Executive Producer.
 
Now 35-strong plus a five-piece band, the not for profit choir consists of adult members who are from various local church denominations including Baptist, Church of God, Wesleyan, Missionary and Pentecostal.
 
Toronto Mass Choir has appeared on many radio and television broadcasts for stations such as CTS, CBC Radio One, CITY-TV and has been the focus for several television documentaries.

Toronto Mass Choir travels abroad has taken them to several different countries including England, Poland, Hungary, Romania, Italy, Barbados, Trinidad & Tobago, Dominican Republic and the United States.

Toronto Mass Choir is the host of the annual gospel music conference, PowerUp Gospel Conference

The choir has also been a special guest at countless church services, festivals, award shows and venues such as The Ottawa Bluesfest, Quebec’s Le Festival de Musique Sacree de Saint-Roch, the Toronto Jazz Festival, the Canadian National Exhibition, Missionfest, the Empire Club of Canada, Roy Thompson Hall with the Toronto Symphony Orchestra, Hamilton Place with the Hamilton Philharmonic Orchestra and at the Gospel Music Workshop of America conventions in Washington, DC, Atlanta and Detroit. The choir has also appeared with well-known Gospel singers such as Tramaine Hawkins, Alvin Slaughter and Take 6, Canadian recording artists such as Michael Burgess and Jane Bunnett and jazz legend, Jon Hendricks.

Mission: To create and perform Gospel music that will draw all people into the awesome presence of God.

Discography
1989 - Great Is Thy Glory, Micah Records
1994 - God Is Our Hope, Micah Records
1994 - The Early Years, Micah Records
1998 - Follow Him, Micah Records
2002 - Instrument of Praise, Micah Records
2005 - The Live Experience, Micah Records
2007 - Going Home, Micah Records
2010 - A Christmas Gift, Micah Records
2012 - Songs From The Evolution of Gospel Music, Micah Records
2012 - 25: Twenty-Fifth Anniversary Collection, Burke Music Inc.
2014 - Made For Worship, Burke Music Inc.
2015 - Made For Worship: Special Edition, Burke Music Inc.
2018 - By Special Request, Burke Music Inc.
2019 - PowerUp Gospel Live, Burke Music Inc.
2022 - Celebration Live, Burke Music Inc.

References

The choir at Encyclopedia of Music in Canada
http://roythomson.com/eventdetail/tmc
http://music.cbc.ca/#!/artists/Toronto-Mass-Choir
http://spotlight.mcmaster.ca/toronto-mass-choir-gospel-choir/
http://www.guelphmercury.com/living-story/5643552-toronto-mass-choir-coming-to-guelph/
http://www.toronto.com/events/toronto-mass-choir/
http://www.torontowaterfrontmarathon.com/en/charity/tmc.htm
https://nowtoronto.com/events/toronto-jazz-festival%3A-toronto-mass-choir/
http://cashboxcanada.ca/5374/karen-burke-and-toronto-mass-choir-how-great-thou-art
http://www.wellandportcolborneconcert.org/portfolio/a-gospel-jubilee-toronto-jazz-orchestra-and-toronto-mass-choir/
http://www.choirsontario.org/LinkManager/detail?id=8a3620c2448aeedf014493dc2b420116
http://www.allmusic.com/artist/toronto-mass-choir-mn0000867051/discography
http://www.wordmag.com/Music/Music_2008.02_TMC_MICAH.htm
http://www.insidetoronto.com/news-story/1313676-toronto-mass-choir-celebrates-25th-anniversary-with-scarborough-concert/
http://www.wkbw.com/news/toronto-mass-choir-brings-their-sound-to-buffalo
http://brantfordjazzfestival.com/jazz-festival/toronto-mass-choir-on-the-bell-stage

External links

Canadian choirs
Juno Award for Contemporary Christian/Gospel Album of the Year winners